Rahmatullah is a male or female Muslim name and, in modern usage, surname, meaning mercy of God. It may refer to:

Males
Rahmatullah Kairanawi (1818–1891), Indian Muslim scholar and author
Shaikh Rahmatullah al-Farooq, name used by Rowland Allanson-Winn, 5th Baron Headley (1855–1935), Irish peer and convert to Islam
Chaudhari Rehmatullah Aslam, known as C. R. Aslam (1913–2007), Pakistani politician
Shahzada Rehmatullah Khan Saddozai (1919–1992), Pakistani tribal leader and politician
Rahmatu'lláh Muhájir (1923-1979), Iranian Bahá'í missionary
Mian Muhammad Rahmatullah (born 1940), Presidential aide, and Chief of Public Works Departments of Bangladesh
Rahmatullah Safi (born 1948), Afghan military officer listed as the Taliban's European ambassador
Sayed Rahmatullah Hashemi (born 1978), roving Taliban ambassador, who accepted a scholarship to attend Yale University
Rahmatullo Fuzailov (born 1978), Tajik footballer
Rahmatullah Rahmat, Afghan provincial governor
Rahmatullah Raufi, Afghan provincial governor
Rahmatullo Zoirov, Tajik politician
Rahmatullah Hanefi, Afghan human rights worker, who secured the release of Italian hostages, arrested by Afghan authorities
Rahmatollah Khosravi, Iranian politician
Rahmatollah Moghaddam Maraghei, Iranian politician
, Iranian politician
Rahmatollah Hafezi, Iranian politician
Rehmatullah (cricketer) (born 1998), Pakistani cricketer
Rehmatullah Khan, known as Rehmat Khan, Pakistani squash player and coach
 Yunus Rahmatullah (born 1982), Pakistani arrested in Iraq by British forces in 2004 and then rendered to a US prison in Afghanistan where he was secretly held without charge or trial for at least seven years
 Secretary of State for Foreign and Commonwealth Affairs v Rahmatullah, a UK Supreme Court case relating to Yunus Rahmatullah

Females
Shahnaz Rahmatullah, Bangladeshi singer

Other uses
Layton Rahmatulla Benevolent Trust, Pakistani eye-care charity

Arabic masculine given names